The 2013 IIHF U18 World Championship Division II was a pair of international under-18 ice hockey tournaments organised by the International Ice Hockey Federation. The Division II A and Division II B tournaments represent the fourth and the fifth tier of the IIHF World U18 Championships.

Division II A
The Division II A tournament was played in Tallinn, Estonia, from 31 March to 6 April 2013.

Participants

Final standings

Results
All times are local. (Eastern European Summer Time – UTC+3)

Division II B
The Division II B tournament was played in Belgrade, Serbia, from 9 to 15 March 2013.

Participants

Final standings

Results
All times are local. (Central European Time – UTC+1)

References

IIHF World U18 Championship Division II
II
International ice hockey competitions hosted by Estonia
International ice hockey competitions hosted by Serbia
2012–13 in Estonian ice hockey
Ere